Neida Nanxiaoqu Station is a station on Line 2 of the Hohhot Metro. It opened on 1 October 2020, and serves the southern campus of Inner Mongolia University.

References 

Hohhot Metro stations
Railway stations in China opened in 2020